Delbanco is a surname. Notable people with the surname include:

Andrew Delbanco (born 1952), American cultural critic
Francesca Delbanco (born 1974), American novelist and screenwriter
Miriam Del Banco (1858–1931), American poet and educator
Nicholas Delbanco (born 1942), American writer